A hadron collider is a very large particle accelerator built to test the predictions of various theories in particle physics, high-energy physics or nuclear physics by colliding hadrons. A hadron collider uses tunnels to accelerate, store, and collide two particle beams.

Colliders
Only a few hadron colliders have been built. These are: 
 Intersecting Storage Rings (ISR), European Organization for Nuclear Research (CERN), in operation 1971–1984. 
 Super Proton Synchrotron (SPS), CERN, used as a hadron collider 1981–1991. 
 Tevatron, Fermi National Accelerator Laboratory (Fermilab), in operation 1983–2011. 
 Relativistic Heavy Ion Collider (RHIC), Brookhaven National Laboratory, in operation since 2000.
 Large Hadron Collider (LHC), CERN, in operation since 2008.

See also

Synchrotron

Particle accelerators
Particle physics facilities